Aldinci is a village in the municipality of Studeničani, North Macedonia.

Demographics
According to the 2021 census, the village had no permanent inhabitants. Ethnic groups in the village include:

References

Villages in Studeničani Municipality
Albanian communities in North Macedonia